The 2011 Bank of the West Classic was a women's tennis tournament played on outdoor hard courts. It was the 40th edition of the Bank of the West Classic, and was a part of the WTA Premier tournaments of the 2011 WTA Tour. It took place at the Taube Tennis Center in Stanford, California, United States, from July 26 through July 31, 2011. It was the first women's event on the 2011 US Open Series. Unseeded Serena Williams won the singles title.

Entrants

Seeds

 Seedings are based on the rankings of July 18, 2011.

Other entrants
The following players received wildcards into the singles main draw
  Hilary Barte
  Dominika Cibulková

The following players received entry from the qualifying draw:

  Marina Erakovic
  Rika Fujiwara
  Urszula Radwańska
  Olga Savchuk

Finals

Singles

 Serena Williams defeated  Marion Bartoli, 7–5, 6–1
 It was Williams' 1st title of the year and 38th of her career.

Doubles

 Victoria Azarenka /  Maria Kirilenko defeated  Liezel Huber /  Lisa Raymond, 6–1, 6–3

References

External links

 Official Bank of the West Classic website
 WTA tournament draws

Bank of the West Classic
Bank of the West Classic
Silicon Valley Classic
Bank of the West Classic
Bank of the West Classic